Rance may refer to:

Places
 Rance (river), northwestern France
 Rancé, a commune in eastern France, near Lyon
 Ranče, a small settlement in Slovenia
 Rance, Wallonia, part of the municipality of Sivry-Rance
 Rouge de Rance, a Devonian red reef limestone prized as a building material

People
 Rance Allen (born 1948), American gospel musician
 Rance Hood (born 1941), Native American painter
 Rance Howard (1928–2017), American actor
 Rance Mulliniks (born 1956), American baseball player
 Rance Pless (1925–2017), American baseball player
 Alex Rance (born 1989), Australian rules footballer
 Charlie Rance (1889–1966), English footballer
 Dean Rance (born 1991), English footballer
 Hubert Rance (1898–1974), last governor of British Burma
 Murray Rance (born 1962), Australian rules footballer
 Patrick Rance (1918–1999), cheesemonger considered responsible for saving many British specialist cheeses from extinction
 Seth Rance (born 1987), New Zealand cricketer

Other uses
 Rance (series), a Japanese video game series by AliceSoft

See also
 Armand Jean le Bouthillier de Rancé (1626–1700), French abbot and founder of the Trappist Cistercians
 Rance Tidal Power Station on the estuary of the Rance River in Brittany
 RANS (disambiguation)